The following television stations broadcast on digital channel 20 in the United States:

 K20BP-D in Phillips County, Montana
 K20BR-D in Gage, etc., Oklahoma
 K20CN-D in Fortuna/Rio Dell, California
 K20CV-D in Raton, New Mexico
 K20DD-D in Albany, etc., Oregon
 K20DE-D in Alturas/Likely, California
 K20DN-D in Wichita Falls, Texas
 K20EH-D in Hood River, Oregon, on virtual channel 49, which rebroadcasts KPDX
 K20FR-D in Hawthorne, Nevada
 K20FS-D in Peetz, Colorado, on virtual channel 7, which rebroadcasts KMGH-TV
 K20GG-D in Duncan, Arizona
 K20GH-D in Milford, etc., Utah
 K20GJ-D in Bloomington, Utah, on virtual channel 5, which rebroadcasts KSL-TV
 K20GK-D in Pleasant Valley, Colorado, on virtual channel 7, which rebroadcasts KMGH-TV
 K20GQ-D in Las Vegas, New Mexico
 K20GT-D in Indian Village, New Mexico
 K20HA-D in Caballo, New Mexico
 K20HB-D in Billings, Montana
 K20HM-D in Idalia, Colorado, on virtual channel 6, which rebroadcasts KRMA-TV
 K20HT-D in Rockaway Beach, Oregon, on virtual channel 12, which rebroadcasts KPTV
 K20ID-D in Kingman, Arizona
 K20IJ-D in Wauneta, Nebraska
 K20IM-D in Barstow, California, on virtual channel 20
 K20IR-D in Cottage Grove, Oregon
 K20IT-D in Boise City, Oklahoma
 K20IV-D in Baker City, etc., Oregon
 K20JB-D in Hollis, Oklahoma
 K20JD-D in Cherokee & Alva, Oklahoma
 K20JE-D in Navajo Mtn. Sch., etc., Utah
 K20JF-D in Oljeto, Utah
 K20JG-D in Salida, etc., Colorado
 K20JL-D in Ellensburg, etc., Washington
 K20JQ-D in Wells, Nevada
 K20JS-D in Glasgow, Montana
 K20JV-D in Overton, Nevada
 K20JW-D in Jacks Cabin, Colorado, on virtual channel 8, which rebroadcasts K06HN-D
 K20JX-D in Sacramento, California, on virtual channel 27
 K20JY-D in Olivia, Minnesota, on virtual channel 10, which rebroadcasts KWCM-TV
 K20JZ-D in Green River, Utah
 K20KB-D in Huntington, Utah
 K20KC-D in Mexican Hat, etc., Utah
 K20KF-D in Davenport, Iowa
 K20KG-D in Pasco, Washington
 K20KJ-D in Bryan, Texas
 K20KL-D in Drummond, Montana
 K20KO-D in Julesburg, Colorado, on virtual channel 3, which rebroadcasts KCDO-TV
 K20KQ-D in Livingston, etc., Montana
 K20KT-D in Dora, New Mexico
 K20KU-D in Montpelier, Idaho
 K20KV-D in Medford, Oregon
 K20KW-D in Saint Cloud, Minnesota
 K20LD-D in Ely, Nevada
 K20LF-D in Wendover, Utah
 K20LH-D in Ridgecrest, California, on virtual channel 64
 K20LK-D in Colstrip, etc., Montana
 K20LL-D in Reedsport, Oregon
 K20LP-D in St. James, Minnesota
 K20LQ-D in Yakima, Washington
 K20LT-D in Diamond Basin, etc., Wyoming
 K20MC-D in Pahrump, Nevada
 K20MH-D in Duncan, Oklahoma
 K20MK-D in Roseburg, Oregon
 K20ML-D in Parks, etc., Arizona, on virtual channel 8, which rebroadcasts KAET
 K20MM-D in New Orleans, Louisiana
 K20MN-D in Red Lake, Minnesota, on virtual channel 11, which rebroadcasts KRII
 K20MP-D in Lamar, Colorado
 K20MQ-D in Rexburg, Idaho
 K20MR-D in Garfield, etc., Utah
 K20MS-D in Richfield, etc., Utah, on virtual channel 13, which rebroadcasts KSTU
 K20MT-D in Mount Pleasant, Utah, on virtual channel 14, which rebroadcasts KJZZ-TV
 K20MU-D in Bicknell, etc., Utah
 K20MV-D in Koosharem, Utah
 K20MW-D in Rural Sevier County, Utah
 K20MX-D in Panguitch, etc., Utah
 K20MY-D in Henriville, Utah
 K20MZ-D in Mayfield, Utah
 K20NA-D in Hatch, Utah
 K20NB-D in Circleville, Utah
 K20NC-D in Logan, Utah
 K20ND-D in Summit County, Utah
 K20NF-D in Seattle, Washington
 K20NH-D in Brainerd, Minnesota, on virtual channel 26, which rebroadcasts WFTC
 K20NI-D in Akron, Colorado, on virtual channel 4, which rebroadcasts KCNC-TV
 K20NJ-D in Elk City, Oklahoma
 K20NK-D in Cedar City, Utah, on virtual channel 11, which rebroadcasts KBYU-TV
 K20NL-D in Grays River/Lebam, Washington, on virtual channel 2, which rebroadcasts KATU
 K20NM-D in Leamington, Utah
 K20NN-D in Scipio, Utah
 K20NP-D in Spring Glen, Utah
 K20NQ-D in Orangeville, Utah, on virtual channel 11, which rebroadcasts KBYU-TV
 K20NR-D in International Falls, Minnesota
 K20NT-D in McDermitt, Nevada
 K20NU-D in Tabiona & Myton, Utah
 K20NV-D in Fruitland, Utah
 K20NW-D in Laughlin, Nevada
 K20NX-D in Hilo, Hawaii
 K20NZ-D in Garden Valley, Idaho
 K20OC-D in El Dorado, Arkansas
 K20OD-D in Valmy, Nevada
 K20OE-D in Silt, Colorado
 K20OF-D in Malad, Idaho
 K20OH-D in Ardmore, Oklahoma
 K20OL-D in Fort Smith, Arkansas
 K20OM-D in Beaumont, Texas
 K20OO-D in Ceres, California
 K20PB-D in Williston, North Dakota
 K20PC-D in Centerville, Texas
 K38AC-D in Alexandria, Minnesota, on virtual channel 20
 K40FM-D in Milton-Freewater, Oregon
 K41LL-D in Nephi, Utah, on virtual channel 14, which rebroadcasts KJZZ-TV
 K45KV-D in Orderville, Utah
 K48NK-D in Cortez, etc., Colorado
 KABY-LD in Sioux Falls, South Dakota
 KADF-LD in Austin, Texas
 KAVU-TV in Victoria, Texas
 KBLR in Paradise, Nevada
 KBOP-LD in Dallas-Fort Worth, Texas, on virtual channel 20
 KBVK-LD in Spencer, Iowa
 KBZC-LD in Oklahoma City, Oklahoma
 KCWQ-LD in Palm Springs, California
 KDNF-LD in Arvada, Colorado, uses KRMT's spectrum, on virtual channel 44
 KDTV-DT in San Francisco, California, on virtual channel 14
 KEFN-CD in St. Louis, Missouri, on virtual channel 20
 KETV in Omaha, Nebraska
 KFDR in Jefferson City, Missouri
 KFNB in Casper, Wyoming
 KFXK-TV in Longview, Texas
 KHPM-CD in San Marcos, Texas
 KITV in Honolulu, Hawaii
 KJCT-LP in Grand Junction, Colorado
 KJNM-LD in Fayetteville, Arkansas
 KJNP-TV in North Pole, Alaska
 KJRE in Ellendale, North Dakota
 KLRA-CD in Little Rock, Arkansas
 KMBA-LD in Austin, Texas
 KMBD-LD in Minneapolis, Minnesota, on virtual channel 43
 KMBH-LD in McAllen, Texas
 KLTL-TV in Lake Charles, Louisiana
 KNMQ-LD in Albuquerque, New Mexico
 KNSN-TV in Reno, Nevada
 KNVN in Chico, California
 KOXI-CD in Portland, Oregon, on virtual channel 20
 KPAZ-TV in Phoenix, Arizona, on virtual channel 21
 KQCW-DT in Muskogee, Oklahoma
 KQRE-LD in Bend, Oregon
 KREM in Spokane, Washington
 KRMT in Denver, Colorado, on virtual channel 41
 KRMU in Durango, Colorado
 KRTX-LP in San Antonio, Texas
 KSEE in Fresno, California
 KSMQ-TV in Austin, Minnesota
 KSZG-LD in Aspen, Colorado
 KTBY in Anchorage, Alaska
 KTEJ in Jonesboro, Arkansas
 KTFN in El Paso, Texas
 KTFT-LD in Twin Falls, Idaho
 KTLE-LD in Odessa, Texas
 KTMJ-CD in Topeka, Kansas
 KTMW in Salt Lake City, Utah, on virtual channel 20
 KTSF in San Francisco, California, uses KDTV-DT's spectrum, on virtual channel 26
 KTSH-CD in Shreveport, Louisiana
 KTXS-TV in Sweetwater, Texas
 KUVM-CD in Missouri City, Texas, on virtual channel 34
 KVII-TV in Amarillo, Texas
 KVME-TV in Bishop, California
 KWSM-LD in Santa Maria, California
 KXFX-CD in Brownsville, Texas
 KXTU-LD in Colorado Springs, Colorado
 KZCZ-LD in College Station, Texas
 KZSD-LP in San Diego, California, on virtual channel 10, which rebroadcasts KGTV
 KZTN-LD in Boise, Idaho
 KZUP-CD in Baton Rouge, Louisiana
 W20AD-D in Williamsport, Pennsylvania
 W20CP-D in Mansfield, Pennsylvania
 W20CQ-D in Hempstead, New York, on virtual channel 20
 W20DF-D in Russellville, Alabama
 W20DL-D in Macon, Georgia
 W20DQ-D in Luquillo, Puerto Rico, on virtual channel 20
 W20DR-D in Humacao, Puerto Rico, on virtual channel 28
 W20DS-D in Caguas, Puerto Rico, on virtual channel 28
 W20DT-D in Vanderbilt, Michigan
 W20DW-D in Clarksdale, Mississippi
 W20DX-D in Panama City, Florida
 W20DY-D in Roanoke, West Virginia
 W20EH-D in Pownal, etc., Vermont
 W20EI-D in Towanda, Pennsylvania
 W20EJ-D in San Juan, Puerto Rico, on virtual channel 26, which rebroadcasts WOST
 W20EK-D in Andrews, etc., North Carolina
 W20EM-D in New Bern, North Carolina
 W20ER-D in Bangor, Maine
 W20EU-D in Chambersburg, Pennsylvania
 W20EV-D in Houghton Lake, Michigan
 W20EW-D in Augusta, Georgia
 W20EY-D in Wilmington, North Carolina
 WABM in Birmingham, Alabama
 WAND in Decatur, Illinois
 WANN-CD in Atlanta, Georgia, on virtual channel 32
 WBII-CD in Holly Springs, Mississippi
 WBZ-TV in Boston, Massachusetts, on virtual channel 4
 WCAX-TV in Burlington, Vermont
 WCBD-TV in Charleston, South Carolina
 WCGZ-LD in Lanett, Alabama
 WCMW in Manistee, Michigan
 WCNY-TV in Syracuse, New York
 WCTV in Thomasville, Georgia
 WCWJ in Jacksonville, Florida
 WDMC-LD in Charlotte, North Carolina, on virtual channel 25
 WDME-CD in Washington, D.C.
 WDNN-CD in Dalton, Georgia
 WFFT-TV in Fort Wayne, Indiana
 WFUN-LD in Miami, Florida, uses WLMF-LD's spectrum, on virtual channel 48
 WGNT in Portsmouth, Virginia
 WHA-TV in Madison, Wisconsin
 WHDS-LD in Savannah, Georgia
 WHSV-TV in Harrisonburg, Virginia, on virtual channel 3
 WJJN-LD in Dothan, Alabama
 WKBJ-LD in Live Oak, Florida
 WKRG-TV in Mobile, Alabama
 WKUT-LD in Bowling Green, Kentucky
 WLMF-LD in Miami, Florida, on virtual channel 53
 WLWT in Cincinnati, Ohio, on virtual channel 5
 WLXI in Greensboro, North Carolina, uses WUNC-TV's spectrum, on virtual channel 43
 WMPN-TV in Jackson, Mississippi
 WNGJ-LD in Ogdensburg, New York
 WNYK-LD in Teaneck, New Jersey
 WOHZ-CD in Mansfield, Ohio, on virtual channel 19, which rebroadcasts WOIO
 WOST in Mayaguez, Puerto Rico, on virtual channel 14
 WOVA-LD in Parkersburg, West Virginia
 WPGH-TV in Pittsburgh, Pennsylvania, on virtual channel 53
 WQAW-LD in Lake Shore, Maryland, on virtual channel 69
 WRAY-TV in Wake Forest, North Carolina, uses WUNC-TV's spectrum, on virtual channel 30
 WSHM-LD in Springfield, Massachusetts
 WSVI in Christiansted, U.S. Virgin Islands
 WSWY-LD in Indianapolis, Indiana, on virtual channel 21
 WTCL-LD in Cleveland, Ohio
 WTSN-CD in Evansville, Indiana
 WTVS in Detroit, Michigan, on virtual channel 20
 WTVX in Fort Pierce, Florida
 WUNC-TV in Chapel Hill, North Carolina, on virtual channel 4
 WUVI-LD in West Lafayette, Indiana, to move to channel 3, on virtual channel 65
 WUWB-LD in West Branch, Michigan
 WVEA-TV in Tampa, Florida, on virtual channel 50
 WWHC-LD in Olean, New York
 WWME-CD in Chicago, Illinois, on virtual channel 23
 WZTV in Nashville, Tennessee, on virtual channel 17
 WZXZ-CD in Orlando, etc., Florida, on virtual channel 36

The following stations, which are no longer licensed, formerly broadcast on digital channel 20:
 K10PB-D in Montezuma Creek/Aneth, Utah
 K20BI-D in Nesika Beach, Oregon
 K20CP-D in Elmo, Montana
 K20KI-D in Rapid City, South Dakota
 KAKH-LD in Lufkin, Texas
 KEXT-CD in San Jose, California
 KTUD-CD in Las Vegas, Nevada
 WAZF-CD in Front Royal, Virginia
 WCZC-LD in Augusta, Georgia
 WDUE-LD in Eau Claire, Wisconsin
 WDZA-LD in Wilmington, North Carolina
 WOTH-CD in Cincinnati, Ohio

References

20 digital